The  was an infantry division in the Imperial Japanese Army. The 17th Division was one of two infantry divisions raised by the Imperial Japanese Army immediately after the Russo-Japanese War (1904–1905). The division received its colors on 13 November 1907. Its original headquarters was in a suburb of the city of Okayama, and its troops were recruited primarily from communities in the three prefectures of Okayama, Hiroshima, and Shimane. The first commander of the division was Lieutenant General Ichinohe Hyoe.

Action
The division was raised in 1905. On 4 March 1908, the headquarters of the 17th division was transferred to rural Mitsu District, Okayama (now part of the city of Okayama). On 18 March 1915, the headquarters of the division moved to a more central location in Okayama city. However, on 26 March 1915 it was ordered to Liaoyang in Manchuria as a garrison force, before returning to Okayama 10 May 1917.

However, in 1925, the division was inactivated. This was authorized by Minister of War Ugaki Kazushige as part of a cost-saving measure during the Kato Takaaki administration, together with the 13th, 15th and 18th divisions.

The 17th Division was resurrected in 1938. At this time, it was formed as a triangular division as part of the general military buildup after the start of the Second Sino-Japanese War. Initially the 17th division was used to replace the transferred 10th division within the China Expeditionary Army, and participated in the Battle of Wuhan. Elements of the division were recalled to Japan in July 1940, while the rest garrisoned the Xuzhou area until relieved by 65th Division.

During the Pacific War, the 17th Division's main combat elements included the 53rd, 54th and 81st Infantry Regiments. These were supported by the 23rd Field Artillery Regiment, the 17th Engineer Regiment, the 17th Transport Regiment and a company of tanks. The division was assigned to the Southern Expeditionary Army Group in September 1943, and was transferred to New Britain in the Solomon Islands under command of the 8th Area Army headquartered in Rabaul. The first echelon of the 17th Division sailed from Shanghai on 20 September 1943, and arrived at Rabaul on 5 October 1943. The second echelon sailed via the same route between 21 October 1943 and 4 November 1943. A separate small convoy that sailed from Shanghai on 20 October was ambushed by the US submarine  on 22 October 1943, and 1,087 men of the 17th Division died when auxiliary cruiser Awata Maru was sunk. The remains of convoy arrived in Rabaul on 12 November 1943.

Approximately one-third of the 17th Division's forces (the HQ staff and IJA 81st Infantry Regiment) were stationed on neighboring Bougainville Island, where they were transformed into the 38th Independent Mixed Brigade in July 1944. The remainder of the division, under the command of Lieutenant General Iwao Matsuda, fought at the Battle of Cape Gloucester and the Battle of New Britain, incorporating the 51st Reconnaissance Regiment in the process. At the end of battle the division was reduced to the couple of the independent mixed regiments guarding hospital areas. The 17th Division survivors surrendered on New Britain to Allied forces with the surrender of Japan on 15 August 1945.

See also
 List of Japanese Infantry Divisions

Notes

References

* Madej, W. Victor. Japanese Armed Forces Order of Battle, 1937–1945 [2 vols] Allentown, PA: 1981

 This article incorporates material from the Japanese Wikipedia page 第17師団 (日本軍), accessed 3 March 2016

Japanese World War II divisions
Infantry divisions of Japan
Military units and formations established in 1907
Military units and formations disestablished in 1945
1907 establishments in Japan
1945 disestablishments in Japan
Military units and formations disestablished in 1925
Military units and formations established in 1938